Chinali (natively called Chinalbhashe) is an unclassified language of India spoken by about 220 people. Many speakers are well educated. Speakers are distributed throughout Lahul (or Lahaul) Valley. It is written in Denavagari.

Phonology

References

External links
The Chinali language documentation project at SPPEL

Unclassified Indo-Aryan languages
Languages of Himachal Pradesh
Endangered languages of India